Cebu Provincial Detention and Rehabilitation Center (CPDRC) is a jail facility in Cebu, in Cebu Province, Philippines. It is a maximum security facility with a capacity for 1,600 inmates.

The prison became well known for its rehabilitation program in 2005-2010 based on a program of choreographed exercise routines for the inmates. Known as CPDRC Dancing Inmates, the recordings of the various routines of the prisoners online supervised by the head of the prison Byron F. Garcia rendered them an international online celebrity sensation and phenomenon.

In popular culture 
Although CPDRC is known for its Dancing Inmates, it has also appeared in a Hollywood film.

The final boxing scene in the climax of the 2017 film A Prayer Before Dawn, was filmed at CPRDC as Thai authorities denied permission for filming in the real Klong Prem prison.

References

Buildings and structures in Cebu City
Prisons in the Philippines